The Sustainable Experience Architecture (SEA) platform is a modular electric vehicle platform developed by Geely Holding. The platform is planned to be deployed to Geely Holding portfolio brands along with the Smart joint venture with Daimler AG.

Geely refers the SEA platform as "open-source," meaning the manufacturer is open to supply the platform to other automakers. Geely Holding has claimed it has entered into preliminary discussions with other manufacturers about potential use of the SEA platform.

Overview 
The SEA platform is more of an architecture that unifies multiple platforms covering almost all vehicle types. The platform will consist of five different core versions covering a variety of market segments:

 SEA1 for E Executive cars with wheelbase of 3,000 mm to 3,019 mm
 SEA2 for D Compact executive cars with wheelbase of 2,900 mm
 SEA-E (SEA Entry) C Compact cars with wheelbase of 2,750 mm
 SEA-S (SEA Sport) S sports cars for sports 
 SEA-C (SEA Commercial) M for Commercial vehicles between 3.5 and 5.5 tonnes, including trucks, vans, and buses. 

Each core platform will further be available in several different variants such as front, rear, and all-wheel drive, as well as single, double, and triple motor configurations. Performance is expected to be competitive, with support for both 400V and 800V architectures, fast charging, and 0-60 acceleration times as low as three seconds.

The predecessor of SEA platform is Geely's pure electric vehicle platform PMA. According to Geely's plan for the SEA architecture, the PMA platform was split into two variants in the later phase with the PMA1, now renamed SEA1, used in medium and large vehicles such as the Zeekr 001, and PMA2, now renamed SEA2, used in small and compact vehicles such as Smart #1.

The first model based on the SEA architecture is the Zeekr 001 (unveiled on 23 September 2019 as the Lynk & Co Zero Concept) and is being launched in 2021.

On 5 September 2021, Geely and Mercedes-Benz Group announced the Smart Concept #1 based on SEA, and due in 2022.

Jidu Auto, a joint venture between Geely and Baidu, intends to use SEA for a full portfolio of vehicles in different segments, starting in 2022.

Models 
 SEA1
 Zeekr 001 (2021)
 Jidu ROBO-01 (2022)
 Zeekr 009 (2022)
 Polestar 5 (2024)

 SEA2
 Smart #1 (2022)
 Zeekr X (2023)
 Smart #3 (2023)

 SEA-E

 SEA-S
 Lotus Eletre (2022)
 Lotus Type 133 (2023)

 SEA-C

References

External links 
 Official press release

Electric vehicle platforms
Geely Holding platforms